Lockie is a surname and a given name. The surname is a variant of the surname Lucas. The given name is a nickname of the given name Lachlan.

People with the surname
Bryn Lockie (born 1968), Scottish cricketer
Jeff Lockie, American football player
John Locke, English surveyor, author of Lockie's Topography of London
Ken Lockie (born 1956), English musician
Tom Lockie (1906-1977), Scottish footballer and manager

People with the given name
Lockie Crowther (1940–1993), Australian sailboat designer
Lockie Ferguson (born 1991), New Zealand cricketer
Lockie Wood (1904–1990), Australian rules footballer

Fictional characters
Lockie Leonard, a fictional character in a series of children's novels
Lockie Campbell, a character in UK soap opera Hollyoaks

See also
Lockie Leonard (TV series)

Scottish given names